Ernest Volkman (born December 31, 1940, in Huntington, New York) is an American author, investigative reporter, and journalist who writes about war, espionage, and the criminal underworld. Volkman, a 1959 graduate of Whitman High School in his hometown of Huntington, attended Hofstra University and graduated with a B.A. degree in Journalism in 1963.

He is a military intelligence specialist and he has written many books on the subjects of spies and spying.

Private life
Volkman and his wife Beverly have two adult children: son Eric and daughter Michelle (born September 14, 1975). Ernest currently has residences in Huntington, Agawam, Massachusetts, and New York City.

References

External links

American reporters and correspondents
American non-fiction writers
American male journalists
1940 births
Writers from New York City
People from Huntington, New York
Hofstra University alumni
Living people
People from Agawam, Massachusetts